Haxey's case (1397) Rotuli Parliamentorum (iii) 434, is a UK constitutional law case that established the right to free speech within Parliament.

Facts
In January 1397, Sir Thomas Haxey presented a petition to Parliament, criticising the costs of King Richard II of England's household. The king was affronted and, with the collusion of Thomas Arundel, insisted that Haxey be punished for treason. Haxey was deprived of his title and his possessions.

Judgment
On deposing Richard in 1399, Henry IV of England successfully petitioned Parliament to reverse its judgment against Haxey as "…against the law and custom which had been before in Parliament."

References
 
 

1390s in law
1397 in England
English case law
Freedom of speech
Freedom of speech in the United Kingdom
Parliament of England